The Menton Tournament (Tournoi de Menton) is an annual international women's football friendly competition taking place every spring since 1973 in Menton, France. It is organized by local club Étoile Menton.

Finals

References

Women's football friendly trophies
Recurring sporting events established in 1973